A pre-entry closed shop (or simply closed shop) is a form of union security agreement under which the employer agrees to hire union members only, and employees must remain members of the union at all times to remain employed. This is different from a post-entry closed shop (US: union shop), which is an agreement requiring all employees to join the union if they are not already members. In a union shop, the union must accept as a member any person hired by the employer. By comparison, an open shop does not require union membership of potential and current employees.

International Labour Organization covenants do not address the legality of closed shop provisions, leaving the question up to each individual nation. The legal status of closed shop agreements varies widely from country to country, ranging from bans on the agreement, to extensive regulation of the agreement to not mentioning it at all.

Legal status

Council of Europe
The European Court of Human Rights held that Article 11 of the European Convention on Human Rights provides for a "negative right of association or, put in other words, a right not to be forced to join an association", in Sørensen and Rasmussen v. Denmark (2006).

United Kingdom
Dunn and Gennard found 111 UK cases of dismissals on the introduction of a closed shop, involving 325 individuals, and they stated, "While proponents of the closed shop may argue that an estimated minimum 325 dismissals is a relatively small number compared with the total population covered by closed shops, critics would see the figure as substantial arguing that one dismissal is one too many". In relation to the pre-entry closed shop, they stated, "Its raison d'être is to exclude people from jobs by denying them union membership". 
 
All forms of closed shops in the UK are illegal following the introduction of the Employment Act 1990. They were further curtailed under section 137(1)(a) of the Trade Union and Labour Relations (Consolidation) Act 1992 (c. 52) passed by the Conservative government at the time. The Labour Party, then in opposition, had supported closed shops until December 1989, when it abandoned the policy in accordance with European legislation. Equity was one of the last trade unions in the United Kingdom to offer a pre-entry closed shop until the 1990 act.

The famous English tort law case of Rookes v Barnard concerned a closed shop agreement.

United States
The Taft–Hartley Act outlawed the closed shop in the United States in 1947. The union shop was ruled illegal by the Supreme Court. States with right-to-work laws go further by not allowing employers to require employees to pay a form of union dues, called an agency fee. An employer may not lawfully agree with a union to hire only union members, but it may agree to require employees to join the union or pay the equivalent of union dues to it within a set period after starting employment. Similarly, a union could require an employer that had agreed to a closed shop contract prior to 1947 to fire an employee who had been expelled from the union for any reason, but it cannot demand an employer to fire an employee under a union shop contract for any reason other than failure to pay dues that are required by all employees.

The US government does not permit union shops in any federal agency, regardless of state laws.

Construction unions and unions in other industries with similar employment patterns have coped with the prohibition of closed shops by using exclusive hiring halls as a means of controlling the supply of labor. Such exclusive hiring halls do not strictly and formally require union membership as a condition of employment, but they do so in practical terms since an employee seeking to be dispatched to work through the union's hiring hall must pay union dues or a roughly-equivalent hiring hall fee. If the hiring hall is run on a non-discriminatory basis and adheres to clearly-stated eligibility and dispatch standards, it is lawful.

The Taft–Hartley Act also prohibits unions from requiring unreasonably-high initiation fees as a condition of membership to prevent unions from using initiation fees as a device to keep non-union employees out of a particular industry. Also, the National Labor Relations Act permits construction employers to enter pre-hire agreements in which they agree to draw their workforces from a pool of employees dispatched by the union. The NLRA prohibits pre-hire agreements outside the construction industry.

For the entertainment industry, unions representing performers have as their most important rule banning any represented performer from working on any non-union production. Penalties are imposed on the union member, not the employer, and can lead to loss of union membership. Most major productions are union productions, and non-members join the Screen Actors Guild by performing as extras and earning three union vouchers or by being given a speaking line and entering that way. The other performance unions do not have minimum membership standards, but those who join them are prohibited from working on non-union productions.

All four major sports leagues are union shops even though a franchise may be located in a state that has a right-to-work law or constitutional provision.

Canada
The status of closed shops varies from province to province within Canada. The Supreme Court has ruled that Section Two of the Charter of Rights and Freedoms guaranteed both the freedom to associate and the freedom not to associate, but employees in a work-environment largely dominated by a union were beneficiaries of union policies and so should pay union fees, regardless of membership status. However, religious and conscientious objectors were allowed the option of paying the amount to a registered charity instead.

Australia
All forms of closed shops in the Commonwealth are illegal under Workplace Relations Act 1996. There was an attempt by the Howard Government to change the definition of what constituted a closed shop under the Workplace Relations Legislation Amendment (More Jobs, More Pay) Bill 1999. However the bill was subsequently defeated.

See also

Open shop
Merit shop
Master contract
Hiring hall
Union shop
Bump (union)
Rookes v Barnard
Agency shop

Further reading
Johnsen, J. E. The Closed Shop. 1942.

References

Labor relations
Criticism of trade unions
Business law
Labour law